Florian Sénéchal (born 10 July 1993) is a French racing cyclist, who currently rides for UCI WorldTeam .

Career
He rode at the 2013 UCI Road World Championships, and was named in the start list for the 2015 Tour de France and the 2016 Vuelta a España. In May 2018, he was named in the startlist for the 2018 Giro d'Italia.
Sénéchal won his first professional race at Le Samyn on 5 March 2019.

He was named in the startlist of the 2021 Vuelta a España, primarily as a lead-out man for Fabio Jakobsen. On stage 13, after Jakobsen was dropped in the final kilometres, Sénéchal held off Matteo Trentin in the final sprint to win his first Grand Tour stage.

Major results

2011
 1st Paris–Roubaix Juniors
 4th Road race, UCI Junior Road World Championships
 6th Overall Trofeo Karlsberg
2012
 9th Paris–Roubaix Espoirs
 10th Overall Tour de Bretagne
2013
 1st  Overall Okolo Jižních Čech
1st  Points classification
1st Stage 2
 1st Memoriał Henryka Łasaka
 2nd De Kustpijl
 4th Paris–Tours Espoirs
 6th Tour du Finistère
 8th Overall Paris–Arras Tour
 9th Overall Boucle de l'Artois
2014
 6th Overall Four Days of Dunkirk
 8th Overall La Tropicale Amissa Bongo
1st  Young rider classification
2015
 3rd Tro Bro Leon
 6th Boucles de l'Aulne
2016
 3rd Dwars door het Hageland
 3rd Le Samyn
 5th Classic Loire Atlantique
 5th Tour de l'Eurométropole
 8th Overall Tour de Wallonie
1st Young rider classification
 10th Overall Driedaagse van West-Vlaanderen
2017
 4th Le Samyn
 5th Road race, National Road Championships
 6th Dwars door het Hageland
 7th Overall Four Days of Dunkirk
 10th Dwars door Vlaanderen
2018
 2nd Gran Piemonte
 2nd Dwars door West–Vlaanderen
 3rd Grand Prix d'Isbergues
 4th Brussels Cycling Classic
 5th Clásica de Almería
 6th Münsterland Giro
2019
 1st Le Samyn
 2nd Tour de l'Eurométropole
 6th Paris–Roubaix
 6th Kuurne–Brussels–Kuurne
 7th Binche–Chimay–Binche
 9th Bretagne Classic
2020
 1st Druivenkoers Overijse
 2nd Gent–Wevelgem
 3rd Bretagne Classic
 4th Overall Tour de Wallonie
 4th Dwars door het Hageland
 5th Le Samyn
 7th Overall BinckBank Tour
 7th Grote Prijs Jean-Pierre Monseré
 10th Omloop Het Nieuwsblad
2021
 1st Primus Classic
 1st Stage 13 Vuelta a España
 2nd E3 Saxo Bank Classic
 2nd Clásica de Almería
 3rd Bredene Koksijde Classic
 7th Omloop Het Nieuwsblad
 9th Road race, UCI Road World Championships
 9th Tour of Flanders
 9th Dwars door Vlaanderen
2022
 1st  Road race, National Road Championships
 3rd Dwars door het Hageland
 9th Omloop Het Nieuwsblad

Grand Tour general classification results timeline

Classics results timeline

References

External links

 

1993 births
Living people
French male cyclists
French Vuelta a España stage winners
People from Cambrai
Sportspeople from Nord (French department)
Cyclists from Hauts-de-France
21st-century French people